The Second Man is a 1956 crime novel by the British writer Edward Grierson. It won the Gold Dagger award of the Crime Writers' Association.

Synopsis
A new female barrister Marion Kerrison defends a man accused of murdering his aunt to get his hands of her jewels.

Adaptation

It was adapted for a 1959 episode of the American television series Playhouse 90 that starred James Mason, Diana Wynyard, Margaret Leighton and Hugh Griffith.

References

Bibliography
 Reilly, John M. Twentieth Century Crime & Mystery Writers. Springer, 2015.
 Roberts, Jerry. Encyclopedia of Television Film Directors. Scarecrow Press,  2009.
 White, Terry. Justice Denoted: The Legal Thriller in American, British, and Continental Courtroom Literature. Praeger, 2003.

1956 British novels
Novels by Edward Grierson
British crime novels
Chatto & Windus books
Novels set in London
British novels adapted into television shows